The 2020 Corpus Christi mayoral election was held on November 3, 2020 to elect the mayor of Corpus Christi, Texas. Because the general election did not produce a winner (elections for the mayoralty of Corpus Christi require a majority), a runoff was held on December 15, 2020.

Incumbent one-term mayor Joe McComb was defeated by city councilwoman Paulette Guajardo.

Candidates

Declared
 Priscilla Gonzalez, marketing supervisor and podcaster
 Paulette Guajardo, city council member
 Joe McComb, incumbent mayor and former city council member (Party preference: Republican)
 John Medina, anti-bullying advocate and former operator at Koch Industries
 Joe Michael Perez, shop owner and controversial political figure
 Eric Rodriguez, environmental manager at Naval Air Station Corpus Christi
 Roberto Seidner, retired physician
 Carolyn Vaughn, Nueces County commissioner
 Pancho Villa, retired photographer

Results

First round

Runoff

See also
 2020 Texas elections

References

Corpus Christi
Corpus Christi
Mayoral elections in Corpus Christi, Texas
Non-partisan elections